Gary Jason Neely (born 28 November 1974) is a Northern Irish cricketer. He is a right-handed tailending batsman and a right-arm medium-fast bowler.

He made his debut for Ireland in 1997, and has gone on to represent his country 23 times to date including at the 2002 European Championship. His most recent match was in 2003. He also represented Northern Ireland in the cricket tournament at the 1998 Commonwealth Games.

References

1974 births
Cricketers at the 1998 Commonwealth Games
Commonwealth Games competitors for Northern Ireland
Irish cricketers
Living people
Cricketers from Northern Ireland
Sportspeople from Derry (city)